Stanley 157A is an Indian reserve of the Lac La Ronge Indian Band in Saskatchewan, Canada. It is 41 miles north-east of La Ronge, and 7 miles east of Stanley on the south shore of the Churchill River.

References

Division No. 18, Saskatchewan
Indian reserves in Saskatchewan